Floyd County is a county located in the U.S. state of Kentucky. As of the 2020 census, the population was 35,942. Its county seat is Prestonsburg. The county, founded in 1800, is named for Colonel John Floyd (1750–1783).

History
On December 13, 1799, the Kentucky General Assembly passed legislation to form Floyd County as the 40th county of Kentucky. The county was made from parts of Fleming, Montgomery, and Mason County, Kentucky. The legislation became effective on June 1, 1800. The county was named for James John Floyd, a pioneer surveyor who helped lay out the city of Louisville. The county seat was Preston's Station, later renamed Prestonsburg. The first court house burned down on April 8, 1808, destroying all the early records, so the earliest records of government activity do not date prior to 1808. Prestonsburg was used as a Confederate stronghold during the Civil War and two battles took place nearby, the Battle of Ivy Mountain on November 8, 1861, and the Battle of Middle Creek on January 10, 1862. Both were Union victories.

On February 28, 1958, the county was the site of one of the deadliest bus accidents in U.S. history, leaving 27 people dead.

On June 30, 2022, a mass shooting targeting police officers occurred in Allen, a city in Floyd County. Three police officers and a police dog were killed, and four other people were injured. The alleged shooter, 49-year-old Lance Storz, was arrested and charged with murder and attempted murder of a police officer.

Geography

Adjacent counties
 Johnson County  (north)
 Martin County  (northeast)
 Pike County  (east)
 Knott County  (southwest)
 Magoffin County  (northwest)

Demographics

As of the census of 2010, there were 39,451 people living in the county. 98.2% were White, 0.7% Black or African American, 0.2% Asian, 0.1% Native American, 0.2% of some other race and 0.6% of two or more races. 0.6% were Hispanic or Latino (of any race).

As of the census of 2000, there were 42,441 people, 16,881 households, and 12,272 families living in the county. The racial makeup of the county was 97.73% White, 1.29% Black or African American, 0.12% Native American, 0.24% Asian, 0.08% Pacific Islander, 0.12% from other races, and 0.42% from two or more races. 0.61% of the population were Hispanic or Latino of any race. The Kentucky Melungeons live primarily in Floyd and Magoffin counties. These families once lived in certain pockets or clusters within Floyd County, some continue to do this. However, most of these Melungeon families have now spread out or moved away, and so they cannot be defined by one valley, ridge, hollow, watershed, area, etc. However, some of their known historic residences were: The upper waters of both the Right and Left Forks of Beaver Creek, as well as its smaller streams, branches, and forks; extending into Knott County as well.

There were 16,881 households, out of which 33.00% had children under the age of 18 living with them, 56.50% were married couples living together, 12.30% had a female householder with no husband present, and 27.30% were non-families. 25.20% of all households were made up of individuals, and 10.20% had someone living alone who was 65 years of age or older. The average household size was 2.45 and the average family size was 2.93.

In the county, the population was spread out, with 23.60% under the age of 18, 9.40% from 18 to 24, 30.30% from 25 to 44, 24.50% from 45 to 64, and 12.20% who were 65 years of age or older. The median age was 37 years. For every 100 females there were 96.70 males. For every 100 females age 18 and over, there were 95.00 males.

The median income for a household in the county was $21,168, and the median income for a family was $25,717. Males had a median income of $30,242 versus $20,569 for females. The per capita income for the county was $12,442. About 26.90% of families and 30.30% of the population were below the poverty line, including 39.80% of those under age 18 and 20.50% of those age 65 or over.

Education
The county's public schools are operated by the Floyd County School District.

Economy

Coal companies in Floyd County
 Blackhawk Mining
 James River Coal Company
 Frasure Creek Mining

Politics
Floyd County is traditionally a Democratic county. The county gave Bill Clinton over 65% in both 1992 and 1996 while George W. Bush never received more than 38% of the county's vote. Like the rest of the state outside of Jefferson County (Louisville) and Fayette County (Lexington), the county eventually shifted to the Republican Party, but became one of the last counties in Kentucky to make that transition. In 2008 its votes went to the Republican Party's presidential candidate for the first time in the county's history. The county has trended strongly Republican in the past two Presidential elections, giving Donald Trump 72.5% of its vote in 2016, only slightly less than traditional totals in long-standing rock-ribbed Republican Kentucky counties like Jackson County and Clay County.

Floyd County is part of Kentucky's 5th congressional district, which has been represented by Republican Hal Rogers since 1981.

Communities

Cities
 Allen
 Martin
 Prestonsburg (county seat)
 Wayland
 Wheelwright

Census-designated places
 Auxier
 Betsy Layne
 Dwale
 Maytown
 McDowell

Other unincorporated places

 Alphoretta
 Banner
 Beaver
 Blue Moon
 Blue River
 Bonanza
 Burton
 Bypro
 Cliff
 Dana
 David
 Dema (part)
 Drift
 Eastern
 Emma
 Estill
 Garrett
 Glo
 Grethel
 Halo
 Harold
 Hi Hat
 Hippo
 Hueysville
 Ivel
 Jacks Creek
 Jump Station
 Lackey
 Langley
 Ligon
 Melvin
 Midas
 Minnie
 Orkney
 Printer
 Pyramid
 Risner
 Stanville
 Teaberry
 Tram
 Warco
 Watergap
 Weeksbury
 Wonder
 Woods

See also

 Big Sandy Area Development District
 East Kentucky Science Center
 Eula Hall
 James John Floyd
 Samuel May House
 Mountain Arts Center
 National Register of Historic Places listings in Floyd County, Kentucky

Notable natives
 Kelly Coleman Wayland, Kentucky. High school, collegiate and professional basketball player.
 Bette Henritze, stage, film and TV actress, was born on May 23, 1924, at Betsy Layne.
 Kenny Rice, Sportscaster. Born in McDowell, raised in Eastern.
 Boyd Holbrook, actor and model, raised in Prestonsburg.

References

External links
 Floyd County Times
 Floyd County Chamber of Commerce website
 The Kentucky Highlands Project
 Sandy Valley Transportation Services, Inc.

 
Kentucky counties
Counties of Appalachia
1800 establishments in Kentucky
Populated places established in 1800